Li Kai-jie (born 22 July 1996) is a Taiwanese international footballer who plays as a forward for Taichung Futuro.

International career
Li made his international debut in a 2–1 victory over Timor-Leste, playing 90 minutes.

Career statistics

International

References

External links
 

1996 births
Living people
Taiwanese footballers
Chinese Taipei international footballers
Association football forwards
Footballers at the 2018 Asian Games
Asian Games competitors for Chinese Taipei